Yoshiko Shimauchi is a former Japanese international table tennis player.

Table tennis career 
She won a bronze medal at the 1979 World Table Tennis Championships in the Corbillon Cup (women's team event) with Kayoko Kawahigashi, Kayo Sugaya and Shoko Takahashi for Japan.

She also won four Asian Table Tennis Championships medals.

See also 
 List of World Table Tennis Championships medalists

References 

1958 births
Japanese female table tennis players
Living people
World Table Tennis Championships medalists